Pristimantis carvalhoi is a species of frog in the family Strabomantidae. It is found in the upper Amazon Basin in Bolivia, Brazil, Colombia, Ecuador, and Peru. It occurs in primary and secondary flooding forest with close canopy. Though it can locally suffer from habitat loss, it is not threatened overall.

References

carvalhoi
Amphibians of Bolivia
Amphibians of Brazil
Amphibians of Colombia
Amphibians of Ecuador
Amphibians of Peru
Amphibians described in 1952
Taxa named by Bertha Lutz
Taxonomy articles created by Polbot